The 2001 Vuelta a Burgos was the 23rd edition of the Vuelta a Burgos road cycling stage race, which was held from 20 August to 24 August 2001. The race started and finished in Burgos. The race was won by Juan Miguel Mercado of the  team.

General classification

References

Vuelta a Burgos
2001 in road cycling
2001 in Spanish sport